Constituent Assembly elections were carried out in Portugal on 25 April 1975, exactly one year after the Carnation Revolution. The election elected all 250 members of the Portuguese Constituent Assembly.

It was the first free election held in Portugal since 1925, and only the seventh free election in all of Portuguese history. Turnout was a record 91.66 percent, which remains (as of 2022) the highest ever in any Portuguese democratic elections (General, Regional, Local or European).

The main aim of the election was the election of a Constituent Assembly, in order to write a new constitution to replace the Estado Novo regime's authoritarian Constitution of 1933 and so this freely-elected parliament had a single-year mandate and no government was based on parliamentary support; the country continued to be governed by a military-civilian provisional administration during the deliberations of the Constituent Assembly.

With few or no opinion polls during the campaign, the real trend of the electorate was unknown, but incumbent Prime Minister Vasco Gonçalves was confident in a victory of the most leftwing forces in Portugal, forecasting that the Portuguese Democratic Movement (MDP/CDE) would win the election, followed by the Communists (PCP) and then the Socialist Party (PS). In the end, this forecast was totally wrong.

The election was won by the Socialist Party with almost 38% of the votes and 116 seats. The Social Democratic Party (then known as the Democratic People's Party, PPD) was the second-most voted party, 26.4% and 81 seats, defending a project that it would soon abandon, social democratic centrism, the Portuguese "Social-Democracy", and becoming the major right-wing party in the country a few years after. The size of the results of the PPD were a big surprise, taking into account that they won double the votes of the Communists. 

The new parliament had a large majority of parties defending socialist or "democratic socialist" ideas and the Constitution, approved one year after, reflected such influence. The Portuguese Communist Party achieved a surprisingly low total, just 12%, considering the overwhelming support in the south of the country and the radical turn to the left of the revolutionary process after the failed fascist coup, one month before.

With the PPD's shift away from the left and towards the right coming after this election, the only right-of-centre party elected was the CDS, which received 7.6 percent of the vote and 16 seats. The other big surprise were the very weak results of MDP/CDE, which polled just 4% and elected 5 member to the Assembly.

The results map showed a strong North-South division, with the more rightwing forces, PPD and CDS, dominating the North and Center regions, mainly in rural areas, and the PCP dominating the South, especially the Alentejo region. The PS dominated the big urban areas around Lisbon, Porto, Coimbra and Setúbal.

Background

The previous parliamentary elections were held on October 28, 1973, still under the authoritarian rule of the Estado Novo (New State), founded by António de Oliveira Salazar who died in 1970. The People's National Action (ANP), the single party of the then President of the Council of Ministers, Marcelo Caetano, had won the all 150 deputies of the National Assembly in the 1973 election, with a participation rate of 66.5% of registered. The election was boycotted by Opposition forces due to complaints about democratic legitimacy and oppression.

1974 revolution

On April 25, 1974, the Carnation Revolution, initiated by the captains of the Armed Forces Movement (MFA), ended the authoritarian regime established in 1932 by António de Oliveira Salazar. After the revolutionary forces proclaimed victory, the National Salvation Junta, presided by General António de Spínola, takes over the position of Head of State and Government.

With political parties once again legal, the Socialist Party (PS) leader, Mário Soares, and the Portuguese Communist Party (PCP) Secretary General, Álvaro Cunhal, return to Portugal less than a week later. In addition, the members of the "liberal wing" of the ANP, favorable to a democratization of the "Estado Novo" before its fall, found the Democratic People's Party (PPD) which claimed to be social democratic.

At the end of three weeks, Spínola takes the oath as President of the Republic, and nominates Adelino da Palma Carlos Prime Minister as the head of the 1st provisional government where civil and military members plus independent, socialists, social democrats and communists were also part of.

As early as July 18, Vasco Gonçalves, a military man seen as very close to the Communist Party, replaces Palma Carlos as head of the government. After this, the first party that doesn't claim to be from the left or the center-left appears, the Democratic and Social Center (CDS), which says to be an advocate to Christian democracy and liberalism.

Barely two and a half months later, after failing to carry out a counter-revolution, Spínola resigns as President of the Republic and is replaced by General Francisco da Costa Gomes, his deputy in the National Salvation Junta. On March 19, 1975, President Costa Gomes officially calls an election to elect members to write a new Constitution.

Electoral system
The electoral system adopted, set by the electoral law approved on November 15, 1974, establishes the election of members of parliament by proportional representation according to the D'Hondt method, known to benefit the parties that come first.

The law fixes the number of one deputy per 25,000 inhabitants and one more per fraction of 12,500. Deputies were elected in twenty-three constituencies, namely the eighteen metropolitan districts, Horta, Ponta Delgada, Angra do Heroísmo, Funchal, Mozambique, Macau, and the rest of the world.

In application of these provisions, 250 seats were to be filled.

For these elections, the MPs distributed by districts were the following:

Parties 
The table below lists the major parties that contested the elections:

Campaign period

Party slogans

Candidates' debates
On the election night broadcast on RTP1, a debate took place, moderated by Joaquim Letria, on the electoral results revealed so far, with the participation of the leaders of the four main parties at the time: Mário Soares (Socialist Party), Joaquim Magalhães Mota replacing Francisco Sá Carneiro (Social Democratic Party), Álvaro Cunhal (Portuguese Communist Party), and Francisco Pereira de Moura (MDP/CDE). The questions to the guests were asked by a panel of commentators made up of journalists Manuel Beça Múrias, Dinis Abreu, José Júdice, Castro Mendes and José Carlos Vasconcelos.

Opinion polling

Results

Distribution by constituency

|- class="unsortable"
!rowspan=2|Constituency!!%!!S!!%!!S!!%!!S!!%!!S!!%!!S!!%!!S!!%!!S
!rowspan=2|TotalS
|- class="unsortable" style="text-align:center;"
!colspan=2 | PS
!colspan=2 | PPD
!colspan=2 | PCP
!colspan=2 | CDS
!colspan=2 | MDP/CDE
!colspan=2 | UDP
!colspan=2 | ADIM
|-
| style="text-align:left;" | Angra do Heroísmo
| 23.0
| -
| style="background:; color:white;"|62.8
| 2
| 2.4
| -
| 6.1
| -
| 1.1
| -
|colspan="2" rowspan="2" bgcolor="#AAAAAA"|
|colspan="2" rowspan="14" bgcolor="#AAAAAA"|
| 2
|-
| style="text-align:left;" | Aveiro
| 31.8
| 5
| style="background:; color:white;"|42.9
| 7
| 3.2
| -
| 11.1
| 2
| 3.9
| -
| 14
|-
| style="text-align:left;" | Beja
| 35.6
| 3
| 5.3
| -
| style="background:red; color:white;"|39.0
| 3
| 2.2
| -
| 5.5
| -
| 1.4
| -
| 6
|-
| style="text-align:left;" | Braga
| 27.4
| 5
| style="background:; color:white;"|37.7
| 7
| 3.7
| -
| 18.0
| 3
| 2.9
| -
| -
| -
| 15
|-
| style="text-align:left;" | Bragança
| 24.7
| 1
| style="background:; color:white;"|43.0
| 3
| 2.7
| -
| 13.5
| -
| 3.7
| -
| -
| -
| 4
|-
| style="text-align:left;" | Castelo Branco
| style="background:; color:white;"|41.5
| 5
| 24.3
| 2
| 5.6
| -
| 6.4
| -
| 3.9
| -
| 0.8
| -
| 7
|-
| style="text-align:left;" | Coimbra
| style="background:; color:white;"|43.2
| 7
| 27.2
| 4
| 5.7
| 1
| 4.6
| -
| 4.4
| -
| colspan="2" bgcolor="#AAAAAA"|
| 12
|-
| style="text-align:left;" | Évora
| style="background:; color:white;"|37.9
| 3
| 6.9
| -
| 37.1
| 2
| 2.8
| -
| 7.8
| -
| 0.9
| -
| 5
|-
| style="text-align:left;" | Faro
| style="background:; color:white;"|45.4
| 6
| 13.9
| 1
| 12.3
| 1
| 3.4
| -
| 9.5
| 1
| 1.1
| -
| 9
|-
| style="text-align:left;" | Funchal 
| 19.6
| 1
| style="background:; color:white;"|61.9
| 5
| 1.7
| -
| 10.0
| -
| 1.3
| -
| colspan="2" rowspan="3" bgcolor="#AAAAAA"|
| 6
|-
| style="text-align:left;" | Guarda
| 28.2
| 2
| style="background:; color:white;"|33.3
| 3
| 2.9
| -
| 19.5
| 1
| 3.6
| -
| 6
|-
| style="text-align:left;" | Horta 
| 23.0
| -
| style="background:; color:white;"|67.6
| 1
| 2.4
| -
|colspan="2" bgcolor="#AAAAAA"|
| 3.1
| -
| 1
|-
| style="text-align:left;" | Leiria
| 33.2
| 5
| style="background:; color:white;"|35.6
| 5
| 6.4
| -
| 6.8
| 1
| 3.4
| -
| 1.1
| -
| 11
|-
| style="text-align:left;" | Lisbon
| style="background:; color:white;"|46.0
| 29
| 15.0
| 9
| 18.9
| 11
| 4.8
| 3
| 4.1
| 2
| 1.7
| 1
| 55
|-
| style="text-align:left;" | Macau
| colspan="12" bgcolor="#AAAAAA"|
| style="background:; color:white;"|56.4
| 1
| 1
|-
| style="text-align:left;" | Mozambique
| style="background:; color:white;"|41.1
| 1
| colspan="12" bgcolor="#AAAAAA"|
| 1
|-
| style="text-align:left;" | Ponta Delgada 
| 30.4
| 1
| style="background:; color:white;"|54.8
| 2
| 1.5
| -
| 3.1
| -
| 2.7
| -
| colspan="4" bgcolor="#AAAAAA"|
| 3
|-
| style="text-align:left;" | Portalegre
| style="background:; color:white;"|52.4
| 3
| 9.9
| -
| 17.5
| 1
| 4.0
| -
| 4.5
| -
| 1.2
| -
| colspan="2" rowspan="8" bgcolor="#AAAAAA"|
| 4
|-
| style="text-align:left;" | Porto
| style="background:; color:white;"|42.6
| 18
| 29.4
| 12
| 6.7
| 2
| 8.9
| 3
| 2.6
| 1
| 0.6
| -
| 36
|-
| style="text-align:left;" | Santarém
| style="background:; color:white;"|42.9
| 8
| 18.8
| 3
| 15.1
| 2
| 4.3
| -
| 4.1
| -
| 1.0
| -
| 13
|-
| style="text-align:left;" | Setúbal
| style="background:; color:white;"|38.2
| 7
| 5.7
| 1
| 37.8
| 7
| 1.6
| -
| 6.0
| 1
| 1.3
| -
| 16
|-
| style="text-align:left;" | Viana do Castelo
| 24.5
| 2
| style="background:; color:white;"|36.0
| 3
| 3.8
| -
| 14.5
| 1
| 7.1
| -
| colspan="2" rowspan="4" bgcolor="#AAAAAA"|
| 6
|-
| style="text-align:left;" | Vila Real
| 27.1
| 2
| style="background:; color:white;"|45.8
| 4
| 2.9
| -
| 7.2
| -
| 2.3
| -
| 6
|-
| style="text-align:left;" | Viseu
| 21.5
| 2
| style="background:; color:white;"|43.9
| 6
| 2.3
| -
| 17.2
| 2
| 4.0
| -
| 10
|-
| style="text-align:left;" | Emigration
| 34.4
| -
| style="background:; color:white;"|45.6
| 1
| colspan="2" bgcolor="#AAAAAA"|
| 4.6
| -
| 11.0
| -
| 1
|-
|- class="unsortable" style="background:#E9E9E9"
| style="text-align:left;" | Total
| style="background:; color:white;"|37.9
| 116
| 26.4
| 81
| 12.5
| 30
| 7.6
| 16
| 4.1
| 5
| 0.8
| 1
| 0.0
| 1
| 250
|-
| colspan=16 style="text-align:left;" | Source: Comissão Nacional de Eleições 
|}

Maps

Notes

References

External links 
 Comissão Nacional de Eleições 
 Centro de Estudos do Pensamento Político

See also
 Politics of Portugal
 List of political parties in Portugal
 Elections in Portugal

Legislative elections in Portugal
1975 elections in Portugal
Portugal
April 1975 events in Europe